Richard Charles "Lowtax" Kyanka (May 11, 1976 – November 9, 2021) was an American internet personality who created the website Something Awful.

Origin of Lowtax pseudonym
The nickname "Lowtax" is a reference to Tennessee politician Byron (Low Tax) Looper, who achieved national notoriety at about the same time Something Awful was being launched. In Kyanka's own words,

Something Awful
Kyanka started Something Awful several months before being forced to resign from his job at PlanetQuake for writing a derogatory website update about a fellow employee. He moved the "Cranky Steve" personality in question to the site in 1999.

Originally, the site was limited mostly to personal content, in which Kyanka personally reviewed video games, movies, and comics which he felt were "something awful". However in later years the site grew to feature numerous writers and columnists, putting Kyanka's own writings in the minority. Kyanka is the creator of the characters Jeff K. and Cliff Yablonski, that are featured on the Something Awful site.

Other endeavors
In addition to administrating Something Awful, he also owned the movie publishing company Awful Video, which released the first and second DVDs of the computer and video game-themed show Mega64.  In addition to that, he owned and operated City Name Sports Team, a clothing line that mocked sports fanaticism and team loyalty; and released his first CD of original music under his ARC moniker, which he derived from his email address at university. He later added Moofwear to this list, a second clothing line featuring drawings by SA frontpage writer and forums member Tom "Moof" Davies. In November 2005, Lowtax released the DVD of Doom House, a horror movie parody he and fellow SA writer and Internet personality Kevin "Fragmaster" Bowen created in 2003.

In 2001, Kyanka was entered into the Entertainment Weekly (EW) Entertainer of the Year online poll, and went on to receive the most votes. Although he received "thousands" of votes, he was manually removed from the top results by EW, which stated that many of the votes for Kyanka came from relatively few IP addresses.  This in turn caused an email support campaign, but EW did not change its decision, pointing out that "similar phrasing" in the many emails proved that only a few people were sending multiple emails. EW awarded "Entertainer of the Year" to Britney Spears.

Kyanka lectured about internet culture, beginning at Michigan Technological University in 2013.
In October 2005, Kyanka appeared at a seminar hosted by the Association for Computing Machinery at the University of Illinois and showed a presentation on maintaining an online community.

As a writer with an audience of video game enthusiasts, Kyanka made some mark in video game culture. One of the most obvious references to him is in the game Icewind Dale II where a tombstone bears the inscription "Richard Kyanka – Writer of Humorous Stories."

A character named "Lowtax" appeared in the comic Smallville #11 (based on the show of the same name). The character was named Lowtax by a member of the Something Awful Forums as a homage to Kyanka.

On June 20, 2006, Kyanka announced that he had accepted Uwe Boll's challenge to a boxing match, which Boll had issued to all his online critics. This boxing match took place on September 23 of the same year in Vancouver resulting in Lowtax's defeat.  Kyanka subsequently claimed Boll had given assurances that neither were expected to actively compete, as it was a publicity stunt. Wired magazine covered Raging Boll. 

In 2007, Kyanka joined former Mystery Science Theater 3000 host Michael J. Nelson in an audio commentary mocking the film Troll 2 for Nelson's RiffTrax website.

Death
Kyanka died by suicide on November 9, 2021.

References

External links

 Something Awful
 Lowtax speaks at the University of Illinois 104 MiB video download
 

1976 births
American Internet celebrities
2021 deaths
2021_suicides
Suicides_in_the_United_States